Withdrawal from Aden was the final withdrawal of British troops from the colony of Aden, 128 years after the Aden Expedition. High Commissioner Sir Humphrey Trevelyan boarded an RAF aircraft at RAF Khormaksar after a short handover ceremony on 30 November 1967. The last troops to leave were the Royal Engineers.

References

External links
Aden Emergency at the Argylls Website
British Pathe clip of Troop Withdraw from Aden
Withdrawal from Aden at Imperial War Museum

Conflicts in 1967
Wars involving the United Kingdom
Aden Emergency
Military withdrawals
November 1967 events in Asia
20th-century military history of the United Kingdom
1967 in Asia